The 2008–09 National Youth League was the first season of the National Youth League, the top Australian youth soccer league.

Teams

Stadiums and locations
Note: Table lists in alphabetical order.

League table

Results

Grand Final

Season statistics

Scoring

Top scorers

Hat-tricks

Awards
 Player of the Year:  Adam Sarota, Brisbane Roar
 Golden Boot:  Francesco Monterosso, Adelaide United – 13 goals

References

National Youth League, 2008-09 A-league
A-League National Youth League seasons